Mohammad Junaid Siddique (born 30 October 1987) is a Bangladeshi cricketer. He is sometimes referred to by his nickname Imrose. A left-handed batsman and occasional right arm off break bowler, he made his debut for Rajshahi Division in 2003/04 and played through the 2006/07 season. He made his Test and ODI debuts during the tour of New Zealand in 2007/08.

Early life
Siddique was born on 30 October 1987 in Rajshahi, Bangladesh.

Domestic career
Siddique has scored one first-class century, 114 not out against Khulna Division, and also scored a limited overs century, 104 against Chittagong Division. He appeared for Bangladesh A in 2006/07.

Siddique made his debut for Bangladesh in the Twenty20 International World Cup during September 2007. He made 71 on debut, against Pakistan, an innings filled with wristy strokeplay, striking 6 fours and 3 sixes. Siddique scored a half-century against India as part of a Bangladeshi record stand between him and Tamim Iqbal in 2010.

He was the leading run-scorer for Brothers Union in the 2017–18 Dhaka Premier Division Cricket League, with 542 runs in 13 matches. He was also the leading run-scorer for Rajshahi Division in the 2018–19 National Cricket League, with 404 runs in six matches.

In October 2018, he was named in the squad for the Khulna Titans team, following the draft for the 2018–19 Bangladesh Premier League. He was the leading run-scorer for the team in the tournament, with 298 runs in twelve matches. In November 2019, he was selected to play for the Chattogram Challengers in the 2019–20 Bangladesh Premier League.

International career
In December 2007 Siddique was selected in the Test and ODI squads for the tour of New Zealand. On 26 December 2007 he made his ODI debut, opening the batting he scored 13. On 4 January 2008 he made his Test debut, he scored 74 in Bangladesh's second innings sharing in a 161 run opening stand with fellow debutant Tamim Iqbal. The stand is a first wicket record for Bangladesh and the third highest set made by debutants. Siddique scored a patient 74 against South Africa in a Test match in February. and it is also the second highest partnership for debutant openers.

He scored his maiden ODI century against Ireland in lost cause in 2010.
He was dropped for the Australian tour of Bangladesh due to his poor run of form in the world cup.

References

External links

Living people
1987 births
Bangladesh Test cricketers
Bangladesh One Day International cricketers
Bangladesh Twenty20 International cricketers
Bangladeshi cricketers
Brothers Union cricketers
Rajshahi Division cricketers
Rangpur Riders cricketers
Rajshahi Royals cricketers
Cricketers at the 2011 Cricket World Cup
Sylhet Strikers cricketers
Legends of Rupganj cricketers
Mohammedan Sporting Club cricketers
Bangladesh North Zone cricketers
Khulna Tigers cricketers
People from Rajshahi District